Batik is an Indonesian and Javanese textile coloring technique.

Batik may also refer to:
 Batik (album), 1978 album by Ralph Towner
 Batik (software), a graphics library
 Batik Air, airline in Indonesia
 Batik Island, Malaysia
 Batik cake, a Malaysian dessert
 Batik, the Tagalog word for Philippine tattoos as well as similar designs in textiles and art

See also
 Batic (disambiguation)